Sesenieli Donu (born 3 March 1996) is a Fijian rugby sevens player. She competed in the women's tournament at the 2020 Summer Olympics.

Biography
Donu is from Vatukarasa Village in the Nadroga Navosa Province. She was part of the Fijiana sevens team that won the silver medal at the 2022 Commonwealth Games in Birmingham. She also competed at the Rugby World Cup Sevens in Cape Town. In September she made her fifteens debut in a warm up match against Canada. She was also named in the Fijiana squad for the 2021 Rugby World Cup.

References

External links

1996 births
Living people
Female rugby sevens players
Place of birth missing (living people)
Olympic rugby sevens players of Fiji
Rugby sevens players at the 2020 Summer Olympics
Medalists at the 2020 Summer Olympics
Olympic bronze medalists for Fiji
Olympic medalists in rugby sevens
Fiji international women's rugby sevens players
Rugby sevens players at the 2022 Commonwealth Games
Commonwealth Games silver medallists for Fiji
Commonwealth Games medallists in rugby sevens
Medallists at the 2022 Commonwealth Games